Nicosia municipal gardens are the largest municipal gardens located in Nicosia, Cyprus. They are in the centre of the city.

Gallery

See also
 Alsos Forest
 Nicosia
 Cyprus

References

External links
 official Nicosia Municipal Gardens website

Parks in Cyprus
Urban public parks
Nicosia